

Fixtures and results

Legend

Pre-season matches

Friendlies

Lincolnshire Cup

Football League Two

FA Cup

League Cup

Football League Trophy

League table

Coaching staff

Charlie lofts

Squad overview

Appearances and goals

|}

Loaned out player stats

|}

Most frequent starting line-up

Most frequent starting line-up uses the team's most used formation: 4-4-2. The players used are those who have played the most games in each respective position, not necessarily who have played most games out of all the players.

Transfers

Pre Season

In

Mid Season

Out

Pre Season

Mid Season

Notes and references 

Grimsby Town F.C. seasons
Grimsby Town